Harpullia alata, common name -winged tulip or wing-leaved tulip, is a tree in the family Sapindaceae, endemic to eastern Australia, and found from Brisbane, Queensland to Grafton, New South Wales.

Description
Harpullia alata is a tree which grows to a height of 7 m. It has smooth parts except for its young growth and its inflorescences. The leaf rachis and its stem have broad toothed wings. The leaf rachis is 11–18 cm long, carrying 6 - 12  leaflets which are elliptic and 6–18 cm long by 2.5–7 cm wideon a stalk which is  6–10.5 cm long. The inflorescences occur in the axils and are 5–14 cm long, on an inflorescence stalk which is densely covered with very short soft hairs. The sepals are 7 mm long and the petals are 12 mm long. There are eight stamens. The ovary is covered in short, weak, soft hairs. The  style is flat and reflexed. The sepals persist in fruit. There are 2 seeds per locule, which are almost enclosed in a yellow to red aril.

This is the  only Australian Harpullia species that has  dentate margins on the leaflets and has wings on the leaf stem.

Habitat
It grows in rainforest.

Taxonomy & naming
The species was formally described in 1860 by Victorian government botanist Ferdinand von Mueller from a specimen collected by Dr Hermann Beckler near the Clarence River in New South Wales. The species epithet, alata, is a Latin adjective meaning "winged", and describes the plant as being "winged". The type specimen is held at Kew (K) k000701234.

References

External links

Flickr images for Harpullia alata
Harpullia alata occurrence data (AVH)

alata
Flora of New South Wales
Flora of Queensland
Taxa named by Ferdinand von Mueller
Plants described in 1860